Harlan Rogers Crow (born 1949) is an American real estate developer from Dallas, Texas.

Early life
Harlan Crow was born in Dallas, the third son of Margaret Doggett Crow and real estate developer Trammell Crow. He has four brothers and one sister. Unlike his siblings, he attended high school at the Randolph-Macon Academy in Front Royal, Virginia. He later attended Emory University in Atlanta, Georgia, before he transferred to the University of Texas where he received a BBA.

Career
He worked as a leasing agent for Trammell Crow Houston Industrial from 1974 to 1978 and managed the Dallas Office Building development operations of Trammell Crow Company from 1978 to 1986. He then served as President of the Wyndham Hotel Company from 1986 to 1988. He assumed responsibility for Crow Holdings in 1988 and currently serves as both Chairman and Chief Executive Officer.

Political activities
He is a member of the founding committee of the 501(c)4 organization Club for Growth, and has served on the board of the American Enterprise Institute since 1996. He has donated almost $5 million to Republican campaigns and conservative groups. He is a close friend of Supreme Court Justice Clarence Thomas; this relationship has made Thomas the center of a debate about questionable judicial ethics. Crow is a member of the all-male Bohemian Club, and as early as 1997 has hosted Thomas as a guest at the group's annual summer encampment, the Bohemian Grove. He is also a friend and former business partner of the publisher Wick Allison.

In 2009, Crow mounted an unsuccessful multimillion-dollar campaign to block the establishment of a publicly owned convention hotel in Dallas. That same year, he provided $500,000 to Liberty Central, which was established by Virginia Thomas, the wife of Justice Thomas. At that time, the sources of Liberty Central's startup funds were not publicly disclosed.

Personal life
His Dallas residence includes his private library, comprising a significant collection of historical documents from the likes of Ponce de Leon, Christopher Columbus, Amerigo Vespucci, George Washington, Robert E. Lee and all the signers of the Declaration of Independence and the Constitution of the United States. Crow is also a noted art collector, owning original paintings by Peale, Renoir and Monet, as well as the likes of Winston Churchill and Dwight Eisenhower. All told, 8,500 books and manuscripts are housed here. Additional items include Napoleon's writing desk and Duke of Wellington's sword from 1815.

His backyard garden is home to sculptures of fallen leaders and Communist icons, including Vladimir Lenin, Josef Stalin, Fidel Castro, Karl Marx, Hosni Mubarak, Josip Broz Tito, Nicolae Ceausescu, Walter Ulbricht, Gavrilo Princip, Bela Kun and Che Guevara. Crow acquired these former public monuments after the collapse of the Soviet Union and the Eastern Bloc.

He and his wife, Kathy, have three children.

References

External links
Crow's biography  at the Crow Holdings website

1949 births
Living people
People from Dallas
American real estate businesspeople
American Enterprise Institute
Texas Republicans
Emory University alumni
McCombs School of Business alumni